Young Sherlock Holmes (also known with the title card name of Young Sherlock Holmes and the Pyramid of Fear) is a 1985 American mystery adventure film directed by Barry Levinson and written by Chris Columbus, based on the characters created by Sir Arthur Conan Doyle. The film depicts a young Sherlock Holmes and John Watson meeting and solving a mystery together at a boarding school.

The film is notable for being the first full-length movie to feature a completely computer-generated character created by Pixar. This was a historical landmark in special effects history and influenced other CGI future films such as John Lasseter's Toy Story.

At the 58th Academy Awards for films produced in 1985, the film was nominated for Best Visual Effects (Dennis Muren, Kit West, John R. Ellis, and David W. Allen) but the award went to Cocoon (Ken Ralston, Ralph McQuarrie, Scott Farrar, and David Berry).

Plot
A young John Watson transfers from his school in the country to London’s Brompton Academy, where Sherlock Holmes befriends him immediately. Holmes’ mentors there include Rupert Waxflatter, an eccentric retired professor to whom the school has given a large attic space for his inventions, which include a flying machine. Waxflatter's niece, Elizabeth, and Holmes, are in love.

Elsewhere in the city, a hooded figure with a blowgun shoots two men with thorns that induce nightmarish hallucinations, causing their apparent suicides. Holmes brings his suspicions of foul play to Scotland Yard detective Lestrade, who rebuffs him.

After a school rival frames him for misconduct, Holmes is expelled. He has one last duel with Professor Rathe, the fencing instructor. While Holmes says goodbye to Watson, Waxflatter is shot with a thorn and stabs himself. Dying, he whispers the word "Eh-Tar" to Holmes.

Holmes, Watson and Elizabeth secretly investigate the murders, uncovering the existence of Rame-Tep, an ancient Egyptian cult of Osiris worshippers. The trio track the cult to a London paraffin warehouse and a secret underground wooden pyramid, where they interrupt the sacrifice of a young girl. The Rame-Tep wound them with thorns and they escape to a cemetery to endure the hallucinations.

Back in Waxflatter's loft, Holmes and Watson find a drawing of six men, including the three victims and a fourth man, Chester Cragwitch, who is still alive. That night, Holmes and Watson go to see Cragwitch, who explains that in his youth, he and the other five men were in Egypt, where they looted an underground pyramid containing the tombs of five Egyptian princesses. The resulting protest was violently put down by the British Army. A local boy named Eh-Tar and his sister vowed to seek revenge and replace the bodies of the five princesses. As they return to the school, a chance remark by Watson causes Holmes to realize that Eh-Tar is none other than Professor Rathe.

Rathe and his sister Mrs. Dribb abduct Elizabeth, planning to use her as the final sacrifice. Using Waxflatter's flying machine, Holmes and Watson reach the warehouse just in time to rescue Elizabeth and destroy the temple. When Rathe tries to shoot Holmes, Elizabeth shields Holmes with her body and is mortally wounded. Rathe falls into the frozen River Thames.

Holmes transfers to another school and Watson gives him an antique pipe that he bought during the investigations as a Christmas/farewell present.

An ending credits scene reveals that Rathe escaped. Checking in to a hotel in Switzerland, he signs in as "Moriarty".

Cast

Production
While the film is based on characters created by Sir Arthur Conan Doyle, the story is an original one penned by Chris Columbus. Though he admitted that he was "very worried about offending some of the Holmes purists", Columbus used the original Doyle stories as his guide. Of the creation of the film, Columbus stated:

When Steven Spielberg came aboard the project he wanted to make certain the script had the proper tone and captured the Victorian era. He first had noted Sherlockian John Bennett Shaw read the screenplay and provide notes. He then had English novelist Jeffrey Archer act as script doctor to anglicize the script and ensure authenticity.

The cast includes actors with previous associations to Sherlock Holmes. Nigel Stock, who played Professor Waxflatter, portrayed Dr. Watson alongside both Douglas Wilmer and Peter Cushing in the BBC series of the 1960s. Patrick Newell, who played Bentley Bobster, played both PC Benson in 1965's A Study in Terror as well as Inspector Lestrade in 1979's Sherlock Holmes and Doctor Watson. As well, cast member Alan Cox's father, actor Brian Cox, would later have a connection: he would play Dr. Joseph Bell, the inspiration for Holmes, in the television film The Strange Case of Sherlock Holmes & Sir Arthur Conan Doyle.

The film is notable for including the first fully computer-generated photorealistic animated character, a knight composed of elements from a stained glass window. This effect was the first CG character to be scanned and painted directly onto film using a RGB laser.  The effect was created by Lucasfilm's Industrial Light & Magic and John Lasseter

In the United Kingdom and Australia, the film was titled Young Sherlock Holmes and the Pyramid of Fear; in Italy only "Pyramid of fear" (Piramide di paura).

The fencing scenes were shot at Penshurst Place in Kent.

Music
The film music was composed and conducted by Bruce Broughton, who has a long-standing history of scoring orchestral film soundtracks. The music for the film was nominated for Grammy and also received a Saturn Award. The film soundtrack, released by MCA, was released on audio cassette and vinyl but not compact disc.  A limited edition of the entire score was released as a promo CD in 2003; Intrada issued the entire score commercially in 2014.

MCA track listing:
 Main Title (1:58)
 Solving the Crime (4:53)
 Library Love/Waxflatter's First Flight (2:23)
 Pastries & Crypts (5:44)
 Waxing Elizabeth (3:35)
 Holmes and Elizabeth – Love Theme (1:54)
 Ehtar's Escape (4:02)
 The Final Duel (3:51)
 Final Farewell (1:53)
 The Riddle Solved/End Credits (6:25)

Intrada track listing, with tracks on the original release in bold:

Disc 1
 The First Victim (2:57) 
 The Old Hat Trick (1:45) 
 Main Title (2:01)
 Watson's Arrival (1:03) 
 The Bear Riddle (:46) 
 Library Love/Waxflatter's First Flight (2:54)
 Fencing With Rathe (1:07) 
 The Glass Soldier (3:22) 
 Solving The Crime (4:54) 
 Second Attempt (1:11) 
 Cold Revenge (4:08) 
 Waxflatter's Death (3:38) 
 The Hat (1:21) 
 Holmes And Elizabeth – Love Theme (1:58)

 
Disc 2
 Getting The Point (6:25) 
 Rame Tep (3:06) 
 Pastries And Crypts (6:44) 
 Discovered By Rathe (5:05) 
 To Cragwitch's (1:32) 
 The Explanation (1:48) 
 Cragwitch Goes Again (1:23) 
 It's You! (6:17) 
 Waxing Elizabeth (3:37) 
 Temple Fire (3:24) 
 Ehtar's Escape (Revised Version) (4:04) 
 Duel And Final Farewell (5:41) 
 The Riddles Solved And End Credits (6:27) 
 Ytrairom Spelled Backwards (:48) 
 Main Title (Film Version) (1:42) 
 Belly Dancer (1:02) 
 Waxing Elizabeth (Chorus) (3:01) 
 Waxing Elizabeth (Orchestra) (3:37) 
 Ehtar's Escape (Original Version) (4:03) 
 God Rest Ye Merry, Gentlemen (arr. Bruce Broughton) (01:06) 
 
Illusionist David Copperfield used the music from the soundtrack for several segments of his The Magic of David Copperfield XIII: Mystery on the Orient Express television special, in which he levitated an entire train car from the famed Orient Express.

This is also one of only three Amblin Entertainment productions on which the logo is accompanied by the music composed for it by John Williams; the others are The Color Purple and The Money Pit.

Reception

Box office
The film was a box-office disappointment, grossing $19.7 million in the United States and Canada against an $18 million budget and ranking 46th for the year at the box office. Internationally it performed better, grossing $44 million for a worldwide total of $63.7 million.

Critical response
On Rotten Tomatoes the film has an approval rating of 64% based on reviews from 22 critics. The site's consensus states: "Young Sherlock Holmes is a charming, if unnecessarily flashy, take on the master sleuth." On Metacritic the film has a score of 65% based on reviews from 15 critics.

Roger Ebert gave the film 3 out of 4 stars, and wrote: "The elaborate special effects also seem a little out of place in a Sherlock Holmes movie, although I'm willing to forgive them because they were fun." Gene Siskel of the Chicago Tribune wrote: "The production is first-rate in all technical ways imaginable, but the villain that Holmes and Watson chase is not worth their intellect or time or ours."
Christopher Null of Filmcritic.com called the film "great fun".
Reviewing the film for The New York Times, Leslie Bennetts called it "a lighthearted murder mystery that weds Sir Arthur Conan Doyle to the kind of rollicking action-adventure that has made Steven Spielberg the most successful movie maker in the world".

Colin Greenland reviewed Young Sherlock Holmes for White Dwarf #77, and stated that "Conan Doyle's creation is reduced to an irritating sequence of in-jokes about deerstalkers, violins and pipes. Instead of sleuthing we get swashbuckling in the blazing temple and swordplay on the frozen Thames; creditable acting, but a crass production from start to finish."

Pauline Kael wrote, "This sounds like a funnier, zestier picture than it turns out to be. ... As long as the movie stays within the conceits of the Holmesian legends, it's mildly, blandly amusing. But when one of the imperilled old men gives an elaborate account of the background of the villainy ... your mind drifts and you lose the plot threads. And when the picture forsakes fog and coziness and the keenness of Holmes' intellect – when it starts turning him into a dashing action-adventure hero – the jig is up. ... the movie lets you down with a thump when Holmes and his companions enter a wooden pyramid-temple hidden under the London streets. ... There's a resounding hollowness at the center of this picture – Levinson's temple of doom".

R.L. Shaffer writing for IGN in 2010, felt the film "doesn't hold up all that well" and that ultimately "the film shall remain a cult classic – loved by some, but forgotten by most." DVD Verdict stated that the film was both "a reimagining of the detective's origin story, but it is also respectful of Arthur Conan Doyle's work" and "a joy from beginning to end."

Awards
1985 – Academy Award For Visual Effects (nominated)

1985 – Saturn Award for Best Music - Bruce Broughton (won)

Video game
A video game based on the movie was released in 1987 for the MSX called Young Sherlock: The Legacy of Doyle released exclusively in Japan by Pack-In-Video. Although the game is based on the film, the plot of the game had little to do with the film's story.

References

External links

 
 
 
 

1985 films
1980s adventure films
1980s mystery films
1980s stop-motion animated films
1980s teen films
Amblin Entertainment films
American adventure films
American mystery films
American teen films
Films set in boarding schools
1980s English-language films
Egyptian-language films
Films directed by Barry Levinson
Films scored by Bruce Broughton
Films set in London
Films set in Oxford
Films shot at EMI-Elstree Studios
Films shot in Kent
Films shot in Oxfordshire
Films using stop-motion animation
Films with screenplays by Chris Columbus
Paramount Pictures films
Sherlock Holmes films
Sherlock Holmes pastiches
Teen adventure films
Teen mystery films
1980s American films
Films about cults
Osiris
Egyptian mythology in popular culture